The Social Democratic Party of Kosovo (PSD) is a political party in Kosovo.  It was established on 10 February 1990 by Kaqusha Jashari, and was the second political party to be established in the newly pluralist Kosovo.

Leadership 
The current leader of the party is Dardan Molliqaj. He was chosen at the party's meeting on 15 December 2019.

Presidents of the Social Democratic Party of Kosovo (1990–present)

In Parliament 
PSD participated in the elections of 2017 in a coalition with PDK, AAK and Nisma, but failed to get any seat in the parliament. The party was represented in parliament by 12 MP's, who all dissolved into the party from the Group of the Independent Deputies, a group of former members of the Vetëvendosje movement. Dardan Sejdiu was the head of the parliamentary group.

In the elections of 2019, PSD participated as part of a coalition with AAK. PSD did not win any seats and many of its members, including Fisnik Ismaili, Dardan Sejdiu, and former president of the party Shpend Ahmeti resigned and left the party.

Political position and ideology 
According to its charter, the PSD is a social-democratic political party, which would position it on the center-left.

References

External links
 

 
1990 establishments in Yugoslavia
Political parties established in 1990
Political parties in Yugoslavia